Pulaski Highway may refer to:

Part of Interstate 65 in Indiana
Interstate 790
Part of U.S. Route 12 in Michigan
Part of U.S. Route 40 in Maryland
Part of U.S. Route 40 in Delaware
County Route 6 (Orange County, New York)

See also
Pulaski Skyway
Pulaski Road (disambiguation)